Alex Alves de Lima (born 8 November 1986), known as Alex Alves, is a Brazilian footballer who plays as a goalkeeper for Náutico.

Career
Alex Alves has spent his most of his career to date in Brazil. He spent his youth career with Ituano. His professional career began with Sertãozinho, he spent two years with Sertãozinho before leaving to join Atlético Goianiense. Following a short stint with the aforementioned club, he left to sign for Santa Cruz. He stayed with the Rio Grande do Sul based team before going on the move again, this time joining Mogi Mirim. He spent four years at Mogi Mirim, making 28 appearances despite leaving the club three times on loan during that time.

His first loan was to Portuguese club Trofense, he made 13 appearances in all competitions in what was his first spell outside of Brazil before returning to Mogi Mirim. Next came loans to Marília and ABC respectively, he failed to register a league appearance for the latter but did play 10 times for the former. In 2014, Alves left Mogi Mirim and agreed to join Santa Cruz of Pernambuco.

He was named on Santa Cruz's substitutes bench nine times but didn't make an appearance before leaving. Then came moves to three clubs in two seasons, but Alves again found playing time extremely limited as he did not make a single appearance for either São Bento, Campinense or Piracicaba. He left the latter on 12 April 2016.

At the start of 2017 he was part of the Altos participating in 2017 Copa do Nordeste and 2017 Copa do Brasil, but new Sampaio Corrêa coach Francisco Diá specifically requested him for the team, so he transferred at the end of February. He moved to Bragantino at the end of the season, initially contracting just for the 2018 Campeonato Paulista season, but later signing a deal until the end of 2020. He became part of the Red Bull Bragantino squad when CA Bragantino merged with Red Bull Brasil in April 2019.

Honours
Atlético Goianiense
Campeonato Brasileiro Série C (1): 2008

ABC
Campeonato Potiguar (1): 2011

Mogi Mirim
Campeonato Paulista do Interior (1): 2012

Sampaio Corrêa
Campeonato Maranhense (1): 2017

 Náutico
Campeonato Pernambucano (1): 2021

References

External links
 

1986 births
Living people
People from Araçatuba
Brazilian footballers
Association football goalkeepers
Campeonato Brasileiro Série B players
Campeonato Brasileiro Série C players
Campeonato Brasileiro Série D players
Liga Portugal 2 players
Expatriate footballers in Portugal
Sertãozinho Futebol Clube players
Atlético Clube Goianiense players
Futebol Clube Santa Cruz players
Mogi Mirim Esporte Clube players
C.D. Trofense players
Marília Atlético Clube players
ABC Futebol Clube players
Santa Cruz Futebol Clube players
Esporte Clube São Bento players
Campinense Clube players
Esporte Clube XV de Novembro (Piracicaba) players
Associação Atlética de Altos players
Sampaio Corrêa Futebol Clube players
Clube Atlético Bragantino players
Red Bull Bragantino players
Footballers from São Paulo (state)